Catholic High School (CHS) is a government-aided autonomous Catholic boys' school in Bishan, Singapore, founded in 1935 by a French missionary, Reverend Father Edward Becheras. One of the Special Assistance Plan schools in Singapore, it has a primary school section offering a six-year primary education, as well as a secondary school section offering a four-year secondary education. Since 2013, it has partnered with Eunoia Junior College for a six-year Integrated Programme, which allows its secondary school students to proceed to Eunoia for Years 5 and 6 and take the Singapore-Cambridge GCE Advanced Level examinations at the end of Year 6.

History

Sino-English Catholic School (1935–1942) 
Catholic High School was founded in 1935 as Sino-English Catholic School (英华公教中学) by the Reverend Father Edward Becheras, a French missionary. Although it was a Catholic school, it accepted both Catholic and non-Catholic students, and was run along the lines of a Sino-English school. The school first started as an extension of the Church of St. Peter and Paul. Fr Becheras envisaged the school as a bilingual institution from the start, emphasising instruction in both English and Chinese, a policy that continues today. In addition, Fr Becheras emphasised the teaching of science, uncommon at that time.

In 1936, Sino-English Catholic School moved into a purpose built school building at 222 Queen Street, beside the Church of St. Peter and Paul. Two years after the new school campus was completed, it reached its maximum capacity. Among notable features of the old school is the science room in the school, the first such feature in any Catholic school in Malaya (Singapore was part of Malaya at that time).

Expansion 
After the Second World War, operation of the school resumed, adopting the name Catholic High School (公教中学) . An increased enrolment saw the need for a new wing to be added to the high school compound, on the adjacent site of 51 Waterloo Street. The new wing featured an auditorium, staff rooms, tutorial rooms equipped with audio-visual equipment. Due to constraints in available spaces, the adjacent church grounds were used for physical education lessons.

In 1950, the Marist Brothers took over responsibility for the administration of Catholic High; a primary section was opened in 1951, with a new school building at 8 Queen Street. A boarding house for Catholic High students was also built. Under the supervision of the Marist Brothers, the school thrived along with Maris Stella High School, which was founded in 1958 to ease overwhelming applications for admission to Catholic High School.

In 1954, Catholic High School expelled all seventy students who were involved in the National Service riots for their absence from class, a move that shocked the nation. Catholic High School was the only institution that carried out expulsion as follow-up actions. The incident affirmed the school's zero tolerance of students' involvement in any political activities, and the school's stance of committed learning 

Pre-university classes were offered in Catholic High School between 1952 and 1975, with a number of outstanding graduates attaining the President's Scholarship. In 1974 the administration of the school was handed back to the Catholic diocese. Before the full nationwide adoption of the junior college system in 1975, Catholic High School was the only Chinese-medium high school in Singapore that offered both the Chinese-medium Senior High Certificate (华校高中文凭) and the English-medium Cambridge GCE Advanced Level examinations to all of its students.

Attainment of SAP status 
The Catholic High School was classified under the Special Assistance Plan in 1979. This enables it to offer students in the top 10% of the cohort both English and Chinese as their first languages. In the same year, pre-primary classes were started to prepare students for primary school Chinese study. With continued increase in enrolment, the Queen Street buildings could not house all the students from all levels, even with double-sessions arrangements. Satellite sites augmented the Queen Street school grounds.  Pre-primary and lower-primary classes were housed at Gentle Road and upper-primary classes were housed at Norfolk Road. In March 1987, discovery of structural cracks at the Queen Street premises of the primary section caused the campus to be declared unsafe. Despite clarification later as a misjudgment, the incident prompted a decision by the Ministry of Education to relocate Catholic High School, for safety concerns in wake of the Hotel New World collapse. The high school section was relocated to the premises of Guangyang Secondary School in Bishan. Both the primary and secondary sections of the school moved to its current, permanent campus at Bishan Street 22 in 1992. In 2008, Catholic High School was awarded the School Distinction Award under the MOE Master Plan of Awards, in recognition of its value-added holistic development of its students through exemplary processes and practices.

Launch of Joint Integrated Programme 
On 1 September 2010 the Ministry of Education announced that Catholic High School would become an Integrated Programme school in 2013. It partners CHIJ Saint Nicholas Girls' School and Singapore Chinese Girls' School in the programme, and students from the school will proceed to Eunoia Junior College from 2017.

School identity and culture

Dress code 
Catholic High School is one of only a handful of Singapore secondary schools to have uniforms complemented with short trousers for all levels. The rule was well supported by the students, stating its convenience and comfort in the local climate.

House system 
The house system is used during school sporting events. The four houses — Edward, Noel, Philippe and Joseph — are named after former principals and supervisors of the school.

Houses are allocated to teachers and students.

Campus 

The seven-hectare Catholic High campus consists of two blocks, primary and secondary. There are five floors as well as a basement. Classrooms for Primary 1 and 2 students are on the first and second floors, while classes for Primary 3,4,5 and 6 are on the higher floors. A common area is shared between these two blocks, where the secondary plaza and two school halls are located. The two air-conditioned, multi-purpose halls serve as venues for assembly, large-scale talks, performing arts events, and indoor sporting activities. In addition, another smaller auditorium is used for performing arts events. Secondary 4 students have their classrooms on level 5 which are also air-conditioned. There are also computer rooms, science laboratories and an eco-garden on the primary campus. Two canteens, as well as a cafeteria, serve food for both the primary and secondary students. Students can also buy school materials at the bookshop.

The school campus also houses a 400 m running track and a multipurpose open field. There is a discus cage, javelin-throwing ground, shooting range, two tennis courts and a basketball court. The Catholic High Sports and Recreational Centre, also known as the Indoor Sports Hall, was completed in December 2008. It houses two basketball courts, volleyball courts and badminton courts, in addition to spectator stands. There are two gyms on the secondary campus. On the primary campus, there is a multipurpose hall that is half the size of the Indoor Sports Hall. Catholic High is one of few schools with an in-campus sports class, where students go through rigorous sports and academic courses. Sports Class students may choose to take Physical Education as an 'O' Level subject, in addition to the standard 'O' Level curriculum. A new high elements rope course was completed in 2010.

The school hall of the Catholic High was a training venue for athletes competing in gymnastics events of the 2010 Youth Olympic Games.

Academic information 
Catholic High School has offered the Music Elective Programme since 2011. This four-year programme allows students who have an interest in music to study music at a higher level, leading to a GCE O-level Higher Music certificate.

CHS-SNGS-SCGS Joint Integrated Programme 
Catholic High School jointly offers the Integrated Programme (IP) in collaboration with CHIJ St Nicholas Girls' School, Singapore Chinese Girls' School and Eunoia Junior College from 2013. Under the programme, students may skip the Singapore-Cambridge GCE Ordinary Level examination in the respective schools, and complete year 5 & 6 of pre-university education in Eunoia Junior College leading to the Singapore-Cambridge GCE Advanced Level examination.

As a dual-track school, 4-year Secondary Special/Express course is offered alongside the Integrated Programme.

CCAs, Subjects offered and Talent Development Programs

Subjects Offered 

 Additional Mathematics
 Art
 Biology
 Chemistry
 Chinese
 Design & Technology (Lower Levels)
 English Language
 Exercise And Sports Science (for OP students)
 Food And Consumer Education (Lower Levels)
 General Music (Lower Levels)
 Geography
 Higher Chinese
 Higher Music (as part of Music Elective Programme)
 History
 Humanities (OP students only: Social Studies, Geography/History/Literature In English)
 Literature (Chinese)
 Literature (English)
 Mathematics
 Music
 Physical Education
 Physics
 Science (modular; for Lower Levels)
 Higher Art (Through MOE Art Elective Programme Centre)

CCAs

Physical Sports 
• Track and Field

• Volleyball

• Basketball

• Softball

• Wushu

• Table Tennis

• Floorball

Performing Arts 
• Modern Dance

• Chinese Orchestra

• Edward Becharas Choir

• Symphonic Band

• Chinese Drama

• English Drama

Uniform Groups 
• NPCC

• Scouts

• NCC Air

• NCC Land

• St John's Ambulance Brigade

Clubs and Societies 
• iON ( iMedia, Occulus, Nuclei)

Talent Development Programmes

Music Elective Program (MEP) 
The Music Elective Programme (MEP) is an MOE programme that allows students with passion in Music to study music. MEP students in Catholic High School enjoy the opportunity to study Music at a deeper level in an enhanced curriculum for Music in the MEP Studios. Students will be prepared to sit the GCE O-Level Higher Music Examination in their Secondary/Year 4 year, at which their musical knowledge and skills will be assessed via the activities of listening and analysis, performing, and music writing. The MEP can also be offered in JC1 and JC2 in JCs such as Eunoia Junior College. Outstanding CHS Level 1 MEP students enrolled in 2022 may be awarded CHS’ Joseph Wallace Family Music Scholarship. This is a non-renewable 1-year scholarship, i.e. the outstanding MEP student from each level will stand a chance of being awarded this scholarship.

Bicultral Studies Programme 
This programme aims to deepen students’ understanding of history, social evolution, economic developments and international relations of contemporary China with the rest of the world, particularly the West. Students will be exposed to historical analyses, experiential learning and other approaches that cultivate their interest and deepen their learning.

Besides covering topics related to China, students learn how the development of China affects them.

Students will have the opportunities to carry out research studies, attend various seminars and workshops organized by MOE and the school, as well as go for overseas immersion programme to both China and western countries.

English Talent Development Programme

Genre 1: Creative writing 
Students’ creative vision and writing abilities will be stimulated and developed through a balanced programme of mentorship, reading, analysis and writing workshops. Students will also engage in discussions about writing techniques in terms of writer’s craft and will undertake an exploration of the wider issues related to the practice of writing.

Genre 2: Journalistic writing 

 Students will critically read the craft of other journalists and engage in the formation of their own original journalistic pieces to discover and develop their own writing styles. Thus, they will be facilitated to develop a writing voice that is an involuntary and intimate expression of their personality and vision.

Genre 3: Script-writing / Play-writing 

 Students learn the basics of script-writing, working on key elements such as plot, characterisation, dialogue, conflict, setting and dramatic tension. Reference will be made to published writing from a variety of genres, with ample mentorship for budding dramatists. This gives them a chance to create scripts for their peers, reflecting issues relevant to their times.

Genre 4: Public Speaking and Debate            

 Strong oratory skills are paramount in making a significant impact in the society and country at large. In this programme, students hone their oratorical skills through vast exposure to real-life contexts and meaningful platforms.

Cnergy Programme 
The CΩERGY Programme is a programme whereby high-performing IP and OP students who exhibit strong aptitude and interest in science are selected at the end of Level 1 base. In Level 2, the students attend lessons after school and participate in enrichment programmes and activities. In Level 3 and 4, these students go through an accelerated curriculum during curriculum time when their counterparts are going through the mainstream curriculum.

The origin of the word “CΩERGY” comes from the word “energy” which is a common theme and big idea that cuts across all science subjects. The letter “C” replaces “e” and it represents Catholic High School. The ohm symbol Ω is the SI derived unit for electrical resistance and it symbolises the scientific nature of the programme within the department. The Latin phrase fiduciam in scientia means confidence in science which all students in the programme is expected to possess.

Through the involvement and participation in external competitions and workshops, students are often exposed to real-world problems and products.These outside classroom platforms also allow for independent learning and access to different environments, materials and equipment. Students may also join overseas trips to Japan for immersions with Toyonaka High School and Osaka University.

In the recent Singapore Junior Biology Olympiad 2021, they garnered a total of 5 Gold Medals, 6 Silver Medals and 15 Bronze Medals. They have also consistently done well in other competitions like the National Air Race and Drone Odyssey Challenge, produced many A*STAR and YDSP scholars over the years.

Humanities TLD Programme 
The Humanities Talent Development Programme seeks to maximise the learning experiences of students through experiential learning and infusing critical thinking skills via an enriched curriculum. This is achieved by providing them with a very R.E.A.L. humanities experience centered on being Relevant, Experiential, Authentic and for Life-long Learning. This programme focuses on the disciplines of Economics, Geography, History and Literature.

Math TLD Programme 
The Mathematics Talent Development Programme (MTDP) aims to develop students who have a strong aptitude in Mathematics to become creative problem solvers and to pursue their passion beyond school curriculum. Students in the MTDP comprise Direct School Admission (DSA) students as well as qualified high performing upper levels students.

In the MTDP, students are engaged in various rich learning experiences such as:

Mathematics Research (Math-REACH) – Students attend a series of training to equip them with mathematics research skills. Thereafter, they will embark on a self-directed learning journey where they investigate a mathematical problem of their interest and learn advanced mathematical concepts required in this particular research.

Mathematical Modelling – International Mathematical Modelling Challenge (Singapore) allows students to be equipped with skills to create a mathematical model and solve problems from real-world scenarios.

Statistical Research –  In this research, students use a variety of statistics knowledge to plan, collect and analyse their data to present meaningful findings for a real-world scenario context problem.

Mathematics Training, Workshops and Competitions –Trainings, workshops and competitions emphasise on problem solving, creativity and developing students’ interest in the learning of mathematics. Some examples of competitions are Singapore Mathematics Olympiad, International Competitions and Assessments for Schools (ICAS) and Singapore Mathematics Project Festival. Workshops on mathematical investigations, puzzles and paradoxes are also conducted to encourage critical thinking.

External Collaboration – In close collaboration with Young Defence Scientists Programme (YDSP), Catholic High School MTDP aims to nurture students’ passion in areas such as data analytics, artificial intelligence and Python Programming. Through this collaboration, students are able to gain valuable insights and be inspired to apply the knowledge that they learnt on real life engineering, infocomm technology and cybersecurity.

School Vision, Motto, Song, Slogan, Mission and Values

School Vision 
The Catholic High student is a leader, gentleman and bilingual scholar of high integrity and robust character, who is passionate about life, learning and service to others.

公教学生是个具有高尚情操，坚韧个性，同时，热爱生活，

热爱学习，并且愿为人群服务的领袖、双语学者与彬彬君子

School Motto 
Care, Honesty, Service (亲爱, 忠诚, 敬业乐群)

School Song 
公教中学   屹立星洲

黉宇高耸   环境清幽

宣传文化   中西并筹

阐扬学术   文质兼收

振兴教育   惠及同俦

发挥道德   砥柱中流

莘莘学子   勤勉研求 

弦歌讽诵   涵泳优游

白云渺渺   绿水悠悠

敦品励学   无间无休

蕉雨淅淅   椰风飕飕

振我邦国   万祀千秋

School Song (translated)

Catholic High School stands tall,

On this Island of Singapore;

Serene and picturesque are its precincts,

And to Heaven does its spire soar.

Propagating Cultural heritage: East, West and more.

Striving towards excellence is our very goal.

Promoting bilingualism benefits one and all.

Cultivating virtues as steadfast as mountains amidst turbulence.

Diligent are the boys in scholastic pursuits,

Joyfully they sing, play and grow,

Never slackening in life-long learning,

Never departing from social mores.

Through the clear sky the white clouds float,

Into the deep sea the green waters flow.

On this tropical island,

We build a nation, forever strong and free,

Reaching out together from here to eternity.

School Slogan 
My Blood is Green

The phrase “My Blood is Green” speaks volume of the strong affiliation and sense of belonging that students, staff and alumni have for the school.

School Mission 
To establish CHS as a school of distinction in innovative and challenging programmes, a forerunner in character building and a beacon for the mindset of excellence, firmly built upon the foundation of Christian values.

School Values 
Love (仁民爱物)

Constancy of Purpose (锲而不舍)

Creativity (革故鼎新)

Continuous Improvement (力争上游)

School events

Catholic High Music Awards 

The Catholic High Music Awards (CHMA or CH Music Awards) is an annual school talent search competition which gives students a platform to showcase their musical abilities. This competition is organised by the Catholic High School's iMedia Club (iON), a main co-curricular activity, in collaboration with the school's music department. It is currently one of the large-scale school concerts in Singapore.

The contest was originally a small-scale event held during one of the weekly school assemblies. It has evolved over the years into its current form under the guidance of Wang Jiunn, the then-concert producer. In its six-year run, CHMA has been held in the Catholic High school hall every year.

Students compete in various categories: Solo Vocalists, Group Vocals, Rock Bands, Instrumental Bands, Duets and Creative Expressions. After several rounds of auditions, judges select the best students to be the finalists, who perform on the finale night concert. External bands are often invited to perform during the finale night concert. Several finalists have gained attention and had enjoyed moderate success in other talent competitions, such as Tan Zhi Yi in One Million Star and Paul Twohill in Singapore Idol.

Notable alumni

Politics 
 Baey Yam Keng, Member of Parliament for Tampines GRC
 Desmond Choo, Member of Parliament for Tampines GRC
 Chan Soo Sen, former Member of Parliament for Joo Chiat SMC
 Chen Show Mao, former opposition Member of Parliament for Aljunied GRC.
 Gan Kim Yong, Minister for Trade and Industry
 Lee Chiaw Meng, former Minister for Education, former Minister for Science and Technology
 Lee Hsien Loong, third Prime Minister of Singapore
 Jamus Lim, opposition Member of Parliament for Sengkang GRC
 Lim Swee Say, former Cabinet minister

Public service
 Chao Hick Tin, former Court of Appeal judge
 Hoo Cher Mou, former Chief of Air Force
 Lim Tuang Liang, Chief of Staff (Air Staff)

Academia and research
 Chao Tzee Cheng, forensic pathologist
 Chong Tow Chong, president of the Singapore University of Technology and Design
 Chong Chi Tat, mathematics professor at the National University of Singapore
 Su Guaning, former president of Nanyang Technological University

Business
 Lee Hsien Yang, former chairman of the Civil Aviation Authority of Singapore

Media and entertainment
 Edmund Chen, actor
 Kuo Pao Kun, playwright, theatre director and arts activist
 Liang Wern Fook, singer and composer
 Gen Neo, singer, producer and composer
 Elvin Ng, actor
 Tay Ping Hui, actor

Sports
 Kendrick Lee, national badminton player
 Gabriel Quak, national football player
 Timothee Yap, national sprinter

External links 

 School's official website
 Catholic High School Old Boys' Association

References 

Schools in Bishan, Singapore
Autonomous schools in Singapore
Catholic schools in Singapore
Secondary schools in Singapore
Schools offering Integrated Programme in Singapore
Boys' schools in Singapore
 
Educational institutions established in 1935
1935 establishments in British Malaya
Schools in Central Region, Singapore